MXM is a South Korean duo under Brand New Music that consists of members Lim Young-min and Kim Dong-hyun.

History

Pre-debut 
Lim Young-min and Kim Dong-hyun met as trainees under Brand New Music. They represented the agency alongside Lee Dae-hwi and Park Woo-jin in Produce 101 Season 2. When the show ended, neither of the two earned a spot in the project unit Wanna One: Young-min finished 15th overall, while Dong-hyun was eliminated prior to finale, placing 28th.

On July 12, it was announced that Young-min and Dong-hyun would debut as a project unit, with both having signed exclusive contracts with Brand New Music before Produce 101 and becoming members of Brand New Boys. The name MXM reportedly stands for both "Mix and Match" and "More x More". The former refers to the duo's compatibility as a group despite contrasting qualities, while the latter refers to their determination to develop as a duo. On July 27, they released a two-track promotional single titled "Good Day". Dong-hyun wrote the lyrics of the single's second track "I Just Do" with Young-min, as well as arranging and producing it with Brand New Music producer, Kiggen.

2017: Debut 
MXM officially debuted on September 6 with the release of their EP entitled Unmix. The EP contains seven tracks, including "Good Day" and "I Just Do". The lead single, "I'm the One," was written and produced by Brand New Music producers 9999 and Esbee.

On September 22, the duo participated in Brand New Music's annual concert titled "Brand New World Seoul", held at the Seoul Jangchung Arena.

2018–present: Match Up, Rematch, More Than Ever,  One More 
MXM released their second EP titled Match Up on January 10, 2018, with total of six tracks including the lead single "Diamond Girl".

In 2018, MXM announced their release of a double single titled Rematch on March 6, 2018, accompanied with a music video for the track "Gone Cold", produced by Primeboi. They worked on their second Rematch single titled "Love Me Now" with 9999 and Esbee. Also in March 2018, they announced a Makestar photobook project, which opened for participation on March 9.

MXM released their first full-length album titled More Than Ever on August 14, 2018, with the lead single "Ya Ya Ya". Following the released of the album, MXM announced would held their first concert titled More Than Ever on September 29 and 30 at Olympic Hall.

On November 7, the duo released special single One More with double lead single, "Knock Knock (TAK Remix)" and "You Look So Different".

Lim Young-min and Kim Dong-hyun joined Brand New Music's new boy group AB6IX in 2019.

Members 
 Lim Young-min (임영민) - Rapper
 Kim Dong-hyun (김동현) - Vocalist

Discography

Studio albums

Extended plays

Singles

As featured artist

Collaborations
{| class="wikitable plainrowheaders" style="text-align:center;"
! scope="col" style="width:15em;"| Title
! scope="col" | Year
! scope="col" style="width:12em;"| Album
|-
! scope="row" | "Baby Can I"  
| 2017
| Brandnew Year 2017 'Brandnew Season'''
|-
! scope="row" | "Sweater"  
| 2018
| Brandnew Year 2018 'Brandnew 7'|-
! scope="row" | "So Special"  
| 2019
| 
|-
|}

Other charted songs

Music videos

Concert and tours
Headlining tours
 More Than Ever (2018)

Awards and nominations
Gaon Chart Music Awards

|-
| 2018
| UNMIX''
| New Artist of the Year (Album)
|

Golden Disc Awards

|-
| rowspan="2"|2018
| rowspan="2"|MXM
|New Artist of the Year
| 
|-
| Global Popularity Award
|

Melon Music Awards

|-
| 2017
|MXM
|Best New Artist
|

Seoul Music Awards

|-
|rowspan="3"|2018
|rowspan="3"|MXM
|New Artist Award
| 
|-
|Popularity Award
| 
|-
|Hallyu Special Award
|

Notes

References 

Brand New Music artists
K-pop music groups
Hip hop duos
Musical groups established in 2017
South Korean boy bands
South Korean hip hop groups
South Korean musical duos
Produce 101 contestants
2017 establishments in South Korea